Charles Henry Brewitt-Taylor (1857–1938) was a long time official in the Imperial Maritime Customs Service in China and a sinologist best known for his translation of Romance of the Three Kingdoms (San guo zhi yan'yi), published in 1925, the first of China's classical novels to have a complete translation into English.

Brewitt-Taylor was born 11 December 1857, Kingston, Sussex and died 4 March 1938 at the age of eighty, in his house, Cathay, in Earlsferry, Fife. Married Alice Mary Vale in 1880, who died in 1891. The couple had two sons, Raymond, who was killed as a member of the Field Ambulance Service in World War I, and Leonard, who died in 1933 from a cancerous blood condition. Brewitt-Taylor remarried in 1891 to Ann Michie.

Career
Brewitt-Taylor's father, a coastguard boatman, committed suicide in October 1868. As an orphan, Charles was eligible for Royal Hospital School in Greenwich, where he pursued naval studies before switching to astronomy. He applied to the Royal Observatory for a post but was turned down on medical grounds.  In 1880 aged 22 he married Alice Mary Vale and went to China to teach mathematics, maritime navigation, and nautical astronomy at the Naval School at the Foochow Arsenal. The school was part of the naval dockyard which had been established to support the Self-Strengthening Movement in its of learning science and technology from the west. There the young man was befriended by the Vice-Consul Herbert Giles, the eminent sinologist, who encouraged him to learn Chinese.

After his house was destroyed by French artillery in the Battle of Fuzhou in 1885, Brewitt-Taylor joined the Chinese Maritime Customs Service, and was  assigned in 1891 to Tientsin. After his wife died in childbirth, he eventually married Ann Michie, the daughter of Alexander Michie, the editor of the China coast publication, China Times. Charles was then posted to Peking, where he became Deputy Commissioner, and then as Acting Commissioner to Swatow in 1900. During the Boxer Uprising the family was trapped in the British Minister's residence. Their home was burnt down, destroying the completed draft of his translation of the San Kuo. His Chats in Chinese was published in 1901. The family was then posted to southern Yunnan, near the border with French Indo-China. Because of his frequent travel, Charles arranged for a junior officer to stay in his house to ensure its safety. The officer developed a romance with Mrs. Brewitt-Taylor, and when he resigned,  Ann suffered a nervous breakdown. In 1907 she returned to England into Bethlem mental hospital in London before returning to China seven months later.

In 1908 Robert Hart. head of the Customs Service, chose Brewitt-Taylor, partly because of his Chinese scholarship, as Director of the new college established in Peking to train Chinese for the Customs Service. As part of this work, Charles prepared a two-volume Textbook of Documentary Chinese, which included study texts and material on the work of the Customs. His wife remained in Scotland, where her family maintained a house, as Brewitt-Taylor became Customs Commissioner in Mukden. His final post was in Chungking. He retired in 1920, aged 62.

Major publications
 Guanzhong Luo, C. H. Brewitt-Taylor, tr. San Kuo, or, Romance of the Three Kingdoms. Shanghai: Kelly & Walsh, 1925. Various reprints.
 C. H. Brewitt Taylor. Chats in Chinese. A Translation of the Tan Lun Xin Bian. Peking: Pei-T'ang Press, 1901.
 Friedrich Hirth and C. H. Brewitt-Taylor. Text Book of Modern Documentary Chinese, for the Special Use of the Chinese Customs Service. Shanghai: The Statistical Department of the Inspectorate General Customs,  1909; rpr. Taipei: Chengwen,  1968.

Further reading
 Isidore Cyril Cannon. Public Success, Private Sorrow: The Life and Times of Charles Henry Brewitt-Taylor (1857–1938), China Customs Commissioner and Pioneer Translator. Hong Kong; London: Hong Kong University Press, Royal Asiatic Society Hong Kong Studies Series,  2009.   xvii, 260p. .

References

External links

 

Chinese–English translators
British expatriates in China
1857 births
1938 deaths
Romance of the Three Kingdoms